Neon Light or Neon Lights may refer to:

Neon lighting, a form of lighting

Music

Albums
Neon Lights (album), a 2001 album by Simple Minds

EPs
Neon Lights (EP), a 2021 EP by Annie

Songs
"Neon Light" (Blake Shelton song), 2014
"Neon Light", a song by Circulatory System from their 2014 album Mosaics Within Mosaics
"Neon Lights" (Demi Lovato song), 2013
The Neon Lights Tour, by Demi Lovato
"Neon Lights", a song by Kraftwerk from his 1978 album The Man-Machine
"Neon Lights", a song by Natasha Bedingfield from her 2010 album Strip Me
"Neon Lights", a song by Annie featuring Jake Shears from her 2021 EP of the same name